Death of a President can refer to:

 Death of a President (1977 film), a 1977 Polish film
 Death of a President (2006 film), a 2006 British docudrama about a fictional assassination of real-life US president George W. Bush
 The Death of a President, book on the assassination of John F. Kennedy